Škola základ života is a 1938 Czechoslovak comedy film directed by Martin Frič.

References

External links
 

1938 films
1930s Czech-language films
1938 comedy films
Czechoslovak black-and-white films
Films directed by Martin Frič
Czechoslovak comedy films
1930s Czech films